Homoeoneuria ammophila is a species of brushleg mayfly in the family Oligoneuriidae. It is found in North America.

References

Further reading

 

mayflies